A Hughes–Ingold symbol describes various details of the reaction mechanism and overall result of a chemical reaction. For example, an SN2 reaction is a substitution reaction ("S") by a nucleophilic process ("N") that is bimolecular ("2" molecular entities involved) in its rate-determining step. By contrast, an E2 reaction is an elimination reaction, an SE2 reaction involves electrophilic substitution, and an SN1 reaction is unimolecular. The system is named for British chemists Edward D. Hughes and Christopher Kelk Ingold.

References 

Chemical reactions
Reaction mechanisms
Chemical nomenclature